SNH48 Group() or SNH48 sister groups, shortened to SNH48G, SNH Group, SNHG, refers to the sister groups of the Chinese idol girl group SNH48. Based on AKB48's "idols you can meet" concept, it currently consists of 5 sister groups in locations across mainland China. Sister groups not only release their own singles, but also perform on some of the SNH48 singles and events. They also send participants in the SNH48 annual events such as the SNH48 senbatsu election.

History 
On April 20, 2016, STAR48 held a press conference in Beijing and announced the launch of a sister group landing plan covering all core cities across the country. Through the construction of multiple independently operated sister groups, SNH48's business model has entered a new ecologicalization in the development stage hence SNH48 Group was made, the first batch of SNH48 sister groups BEJ48 in Beijing and GNZ48 in Guangzhou were introduced for the first time. On June 6, 2016, AKB48 announced it had suspended its partnership with SNH48 due to the latter's contract violations. On Following the statement, SNH48 declared that it had been completely independent from AKB48 from the beginning and SNH48 management had never made any form of partnership with AKS. Because of this, SNH48 was removed from AKB48 Group.

On January 7, 2017, Star48 announced the formation of boy band N2M during SNH48's third "Request Time" , however on February 24, in order for it to concentrate on SNH48 and its sister groups, the management of N2Mwas transferred to Nuclear Fire Media. On January 12, SNH48's sister group in Shenyang, SHY48, was formed, and they held their first performance in the newly opened SHY48 theatre.

On June 2, 2017, Star48 held the launching ceremony for SNH48's fourth General Election, in which a sister group, CKG48, was announced, it is the fourth sister group of SNH48 based in Chongqing. During SNH48's fourth General Election held on July 29, 2017, auditions were held for SNH48's ninth-generation members and also for BEJ48, GNZ48 and SHY48's fourth-generation members and CKG48's first-generation members.  On September 25, 2017, the management announced that it would establish CGT48, a sister group based in Chengdu, but related plans have been canceled.

On October 27 of the same year, CKG48 members are introduced and held a press conference at the Star Dream Theater on Nanbin Road. The official sister group of SNH48 settled in the southwest for the first time. CKG48 will perform in Chongqing for a long time. The current two teams, Team C and Team K, will officially debut on November 3 and 4, respectively. They debuted and performed for the first time at the Star Dream Theater, the exclusive theater of CKG48. On December 3, auditions were held for SNH48's tenth-generation members, BEJ48, GNZ48, and SHY48's fifth-generation members, and CKG48's third-generation members.

On January 19, 2019, SHY48 and CKG48 were disbanded after SNH48 Group Grand Shuffle 2019 and IDOLS Ft was announced. On March 16, CKG48 announced its reorganization without teams  after being disbanded due to budget constraints and poor attendance in their prior stadium.

On January 2, 2020, Star48 announced JNR48, a sister group created by Shanghai Xiaoyuan Art, which recruits girls between the ages of 6 and 14 who love to sing, dance and perform. On June 6, 2020 the 1st Generation or JNR48 was announced.

Current groups

Former groups

Group Timeline

SNH48 Group timeline

Distribution Map

SNH48 Distribution map

See also 

 List of SNH48 members
 Sakamichi Series
 AKB48 Group

References 

Chinese musical groups